Erik Lund is the name of:

 Erik Lund (director) (born 1893), a German film director of the silent era
Erik Lund (rugby union) (born 1979), Norwegian international rugby player
Erik Lund (footballer) (born 1988), Swedish footballer
Erik Swane Lund (1923–2012), Danish Olympic fencer